Michael McNeil (born 7 February 1940) is a former Middlesbrough and Ipswich Town footballer who made nine appearances for England in 1960 and 1961. During his career he made 178 Football League appearances for Middlesbrough and almost 150 appearances for Ipswich Town.

Playing career
McNeil was born in Middlesbrough; after leaving school, the Middlesbrough Boys player was studying to become an analytical chemist. He was spotted by Middlesbrough coach Jimmy Gordon and he signed for Boro.

He made his Middlesbrough debut aged 18, in a game verus Brighton, in which Boro won 6–4. He soon lost his place, but the next season he moved to left-back and made the position his own, retaining it for the next two seasons. Despite Middlesbrough being in the Second Division, McNeil was called up by the England national team, having already represented the under-23 side. He was only 21 when he won his last cap.

The emergence of other talents at Middlesbrough, including left-back Gordon Jones, saw McNeil shuffled around the defensive line to central defense, and then to right-back before Cyril Knowles' arrival move him back to the left.

Following 193 appearances and 3 goals in all competitions, McNeil's sale to Ipswich Town in 1964 was greeted with derision by the fans, having also lost Alan Peacock and Knowles recently. However, McNeil had suffered injuries of late, and had disagreements with manager Raich Carter, handing in a transfer request.

While at Ipswich, McNeil won promotion. In 1971, in his early 30s, he quit the game to set up a highly successful sports outfitters in Bury St Edmunds.

References

External links 
Mick McNeil at Pride of Anglia

Living people
1940 births
English footballers
Footballers from Middlesbrough
Association football fullbacks
England international footballers
English Football League players
Middlesbrough F.C. players
Ipswich Town F.C. players
Cambridge City F.C. players
England under-23 international footballers
English Football League representative players